Edgware was a London and North Eastern Railway (LNER) station located on Station Road in Edgware, north London. It was opened in 1867 and was in use as a passenger station until 1939, then as a goods yard until 1964.

It is not to be confused with the London Underground's Edgware Underground station, served by the Northern line, situated approximately 200 metres to the north-east of the site of the old Edgware railway station.

History

The station was built as the northern terminus of the single track Edgware, Highgate and London Railway (E&HLR) and was opened on 22 August 1867 by the Great Northern Railway (GNR) (which had taken over the EH&LR) in what was then rural Middlesex. The line ran from Finsbury Park to Edgware via Highgate. At opening the previous station on the line was Mill Hill (now Mill Hill East). In 1906 Mill Hill (The Hale) station opened between them.

At first, services ran from Edgware to Finsbury Park, King's Cross and, via Snow Hill tunnel, to Ludgate Hill, Blackfriars and Loughborough Road on the south of the Thames. After 1869, trains terminated at Moorgate. Services could also run from Finsbury Park via the North London Railway to Broad Street after the Canonbury-Finsbury Park link opened in 1875. 14 trains a day ran from Edgware to King's Cross.

In 1923, the line became part of the LNER after the 1921 Railways Act created the Big Four railway companies. In 1924 the London Underground's Hampstead Tube was extended north from Golders Green to its own station north of the LNER's.

In 1935, the London Passenger Transport Board planned to take over the LNER's Edgware, High Barnet and Alexandra Palace branches as part of the "Northern Heights" part of the "New Works Programme". The track would be electrified and modernised for use with electric trains and amalgamated with the London Underground's Morden-Edgware line to form what is now the Northern line. The integration of the line meant the closure of Edgware railway station and the connection of its track to the Underground station, which was to be expanded to take the additional traffic.

Works began in the late 1930s and were at an advanced stage when they were interrupted and halted by the Second World War. The section of line between Finchley Central station and Edgware was closed to passenger services on 11 September 1939.

After the war a shortage of funds and the introduction of the Metropolitan Green Belt led to the cancellation of the unfinished Northern line elements of the "New Works Programme" in 1950. The goods yard at Edgware continued to operate with British Rail trains running from Finsbury Park until 1 June 1964 when it was completely closed. Today, the track has been removed and the platforms and station buildings have been demolished. The site of Edgware railway station is now occupied by a shopping centre called The Broadwalk Centre, alongside part of whose car park runs a small stretch of the former trackbed, leading to the still-standing bridge over the Northern line tracks into the Underground station.

Notes and references

Notes

References

Bibliography

Railway stations in Great Britain opened in 1867
Railway stations in Great Britain closed in 1939
Railway stations in Great Britain closed in 1964
Former Great Northern Railway stations
Disused railway stations in the London Borough of Barnet
Railway station